Gilbert Bailliu (born 4 September 1936 in Bruges) is a Belgian former football player. Bailliu was an easily scoring striker.

Bailliu started his career at Cercle Brugge. He made his début for the first team in 1954 against FC Izegem. At that time, Cercle were playing in third division, their lowest ever. It would last until 1957 for Bailliu to play on a regular basis for the first team. This was due to his conscription and a knee injury. But after these problems, Bailliu would become a key player for the green and black side, becoming top scorer of the team for 5 seasons. This way, he had a great deal in achieving promotion back to the highest level of Belgian football in 1961. And even at the highest level, Bailliu would remain a goal scoring machine.

In 1966, Cercle were relegated to second division. But more disastrous were the corruption rumours spread by Lierse player Bogaerts, who said he had been approached by someone of Cercle. Although Cercle formally denied these rumours, they were sentenced to play in third division, back to where they were 5 years ago. Even though Cercle's vice-president won a lawsuit against the KBVB which declared him innocent in the corruption case, the damage had been done, and Cercle remained at the third level of Belgian football. This caused Cercle to lose important players, a.o. Gilbert Bailliu. He chose to leave Cercle for city rivals Club Brugge, a much-discussed transfer.

Also at Club Brugge, Bailliu kept on showing his goal scoring capacities. Bailliu won the Belgian Cup in 1968 after defeating Beerschot with penalties.

External links
Cerclemuseum.be 

1936 births
Living people
Footballers from Bruges
Belgian footballers
Association football forwards
Cercle Brugge K.S.V. players
Club Brugge KV players
Belgian Pro League players
Challenger Pro League players